Aadorf railway station is a railway station in the municipality of Aadorf, in the Swiss canton of Thurgau. It is an intermediate stop on the standard gauge St. Gallen–Winterthur line of Swiss Federal Railways.

Services 
The following services stop at Aadorf:

References

External links 
 
 

Railway stations in Switzerland opened in 1855
Railway stations in the canton of Thurgau
Swiss Federal Railways stations